The Chicago Climate Action Plan (CCAP) is Chicago's climate change mitigation and adaptation strategy that was adopted in September 2008. The CCAP has an overarching goal of reducing Chicago's greenhouse gas emissions to 80 percent below 1990 levels by 2050, with an interim goal of 25 percent below 1990 levels by 2020.

Background
A greenhouse gas emissions forecast projected that Chicago’s emissions would increase to 39.3 million metric tons of carbon dioxide equivalent by 2020 under a business-as-usual scenario. One projected global warming impact is an increase in days that have temperatures over one hundred degrees. Under the business-as-usual scenario, the number of these days would increase to thirty-one annually, while under a lower emissions scenario, such as that called for in the Chicago Climate Action Plan, the number of these days would increase to eight annually. Climate change has many impacts, including an economic impact. The Chicago Climate Action Plan seeks to address climate change by decreasing greenhouse gas emissions to mitigate its effects, while preparing for climate change through adaptation actions.

Design
The Chicago Climate Action Plan consists of five strategies: Energy Efficient Buildings; Clean & Renewable Energy Sources; Improved Transportation Options; Reduced Waste & Industrial Pollution; and Adaptation. The first four strategies are designed to mitigate climate change, while the fifth strategy aims to adapt to climate change.

Energy efficient buildings
According to a 2000 greenhouse gas emission inventory, building and other energy uses are responsible for 70 percent of Chicago's emissions. The Energy Efficient Buildings strategy accounts for 30 percent of Chicago's total greenhouse gas reductions. Building energy efficiency improvements are projected to have a diverse set of benefits, including savings on energy bills for building owners, job creation in the building retrofit field, and decreased greenhouse gas emissions.

Clean & renewable energy sources
The Clean & Renewable Energy strategy accounts for 34 percent of Chicago's total greenhouse gas reductions. This strategy includes a focus on distributed generation as an efficient and lower-emission alternative to central power plants. Household renewable power is another action that reduces greenhouse gas emissions.

Improved transportation options
According to a 2000 greenhouse gas emissions inventory, transportation is responsible for 30 percent of Chicago's emissions. The Improved Transportation Options strategy accounts for 23 percent of Chicago's total greenhouse gas reductions. This strategy focuses on the availability and use of alternative modes of transportation to driving as well as reducing the emissions associated with driving.

Reduced waste & industrial pollution
According to a 2000 greenhouse gas emissions inventory, waste and industrial processes are responsible for nine percent of Chicago's emissions. The Reduced Waste & Industrial Pollution strategy accounts for 13 percent of Chicago's total greenhouse gas reductions. In addition to focusing on waste, this strategy has actions to reduce the emissions from refrigerants and use green infrastructure to capture stormwater.

Adaptation
The Adaptation strategy does not include a greenhouse gas emission reduction target. Instead, this strategy focuses on preparing for the effects of climate change. This strategy has actions to prepare for extreme heat and urban heat island, extreme precipitation and heavy flooding, and ecosystem changes. In addition, there are actions to engage the public and businesses.

Progress
In 2010, a Chicago Climate Action Plan Progress Report was released and covers highlights from January 2008 through December 2009 .

See also
 Politics of global warming (United States)

References

Emissions reduction
Climate change policy
Climate action plans
Chicago
Environment of Illinois